The Thai television mystery music game show I Can See Your Voice Thailand premiered the third season on Workpoint TV on 21 November 2018. This season runs for two years that aired 101 episodes, making it the longest in ICSYV franchise by duration.

Due to the COVID-19 pandemic, this programme is filmed under health and safety protocols being implemented for this season.

Gameplay

Format
For this season, there are two different formats:

Original format
Under the original format, the guest artist can eliminate one or two mystery singers after each round. The game concludes with the last mystery singer standing which depends on the outcome of a duet performance with a guest artist.

Battle format (some episodes)
Under the battle format (adopted from Giọng ải giọng ai), both opponents can eliminate one singer each in the first two rounds, and then both can choose one singer each to join the final performance in the third round. At the end of the game, the conditions for mystery singers chosen by opposing guest artists depending on the outcome of a final performance, if:

Rounds
Each episode presents the guest artist with seven people whose identities and singing voices are kept concealed until they are eliminated to perform on the "stage of truth" or remain in the end to perform the final duet.

Episodes (2018)

Guest artists

Panelists

Episodes (2019)

Guest artists

Panelists

Episodes (2020)

Guest artists

Panelists

Notes

References 

I Can See Your Voice Thailand
2018 Thai television seasons
2019 Thai television seasons
2020 Thai television seasons
Television series impacted by the COVID-19 pandemic